Cereus insularis is a species of columnar cactus found in Brazil.

References

External links
 
 

insularis